Richard Shannon is a writer, performer, and speaker.

Biography

He was born on 17 April 1954 in Three Rivers, Texas. He published the science fiction semi-prozine  Trajectories - The Magazine of Science Fiction in the Southwest during the 1980s. His writing has appeared in Factsheet Five, the collected Why Publish?, and The American Book Review. He served two terms on the board of directors of the Austin Writers' League, now the Writers' League of Texas, one as Secretary of the Board, and three years on the board of directors of the Austin Celtic Association, two as President. He was festival director of the Austin Celtic Festival for those same two years. Shannon appeared as an extra in the films The Newton Boys by Richard Linklater and Two for Texas, a Ted Turner "made for tv" movie from 1989. He now lives in south-central Texas, where he writes and consults on marketing, publishing, and editorial projects.

References

 Why Publish? Mike Gunderloy (FactsheetFive), 1989, 54 pages, paperback - Available as e-zine download/online ; page 45: Category: Fate: Richard Shannon - TRAJECTORIES
 (Trajectories - the Journal of Science Fiction in the Southwest), 1987, vol. 3 issue 1, Tabloid - Masthead: Publisher  - Richard Shannon
 Cyberpunks on Dope, w/ Susan Sneller, Editor, American Book Review, Vol. 11, No.5, November–December 1989, Special Focus: High Latitudes: Mapping the Drug Maze.

1954 births
Living people
American male writers
People from Three Rivers, Texas